Kodimbala  is a village in the southern state of Karnataka, India. It is located in the Puttur taluk of Dakshina Kannada district in Karnataka.

Demographics
 India census, Kodimbala had a population of 5427 with 2754 males and 2673 females.

See also
 Dakshina Kannada
 Districts of Karnataka

References

External links
 info

Villages in Dakshina Kannada district